Bholekane is a town in northern Eswatini. It is located on the banks of the Nkomati River, to the north of Mliba and south of Herefords; it is approximately 100 kilometers northeast of Mbabane.

References
Fitzpatrick, M., Blond, B., Pitcher, G., Richmond, S., and Warren, M. (2004)  South Africa, Lesotho and Swaziland. Footscray, VIC: Lonely Planet.

Populated places in Eswatini